Fatimah Rifaat (June 5, 1930 – January 1996), better known by her pen name Alifa Rifaat, was an Egyptian author whose controversial short stories are renowned for their depictions of the dynamics of female sexuality, relationships, and loss in rural Egyptian culture. While taking on such controversial subjects, Fatimah Rifaat's protagonists remained religiously faithful with passive feelings towards their fate. Her stories did not attempt to undermine the patriarchal system; rather they were used to depict the problems inherent in a patriarchal society when men do not adhere to their religious teachings that advocate for the kind treatment of women. Fatimah Rifaat used the pseudonym Alifa to prevent embarrassment on the part of her family due to the themes of her stories and her writing career.

Life
Fatma Abdullah Rifaat was born on June 5, 1930, in Cairo, Egypt. Her father was an architect and her mother was a housewife. Her family boasted that their roots are said to extend back to Umar ibn al-Khattab, a companion and advisor to the prophet Muhammad. She was raised in provincial Egypt and spent most of her life there. Subsequently, rural Egypt became the setting for most of her stories. Her active interest in writing began at age nine when she wrote a poem expressing the despair in her village.  For this she was met with punishment by her family due to the poem's subject matter.  Fatimah attended Misr al-Jadidah Primary school and The Cultural Center for Women for her intermediate education.  She also attended the British Institute in Cairo from 1946 to 1949 where she studied English.  When Alifa Rifaat expressed interest in continuing her education by enrolling in the College of Fine Arts in Egypt her father instead arranged for her to marry her cousin, a police officer.

For the first few years of their marriage, her husband allowed her to write and publish stories under her pseudonym despite the common idea of writing being a purely masculine field in Egyptian culture.  She published her stories from 1955 until 1960 when she chose to stop after facing pressure from her husband to end her writing career.  During this nearly 14-year period of literary silence Alifa Rifaat pursued the study of literature, astronomy, and history.  Despite her attempts at preoccupation through these means Alifa Rifaat remained frustrated at her inability to express herself and the societal issues she faced as a woman through literary means.

In 1973, after facing a serious illness, Alifa's husband allowed her once more to write and publish her work. She continued on to publish a collection of short stories and two novels beginning with the short story "My World of the Unknown," for which she gained initial popularity.

Alifa Rifaat's husband died in 1979.  Although she travelled across provincial Egypt in accordance with her husband's transfers for work she never left Egypt until after his death.  She continued on to make the [hajj], the sacred pilgrimage to Mecca, in 1981 and travelled to multiple European and Arab states including England, Turkey, Germany, Morocco, and Austria.

Throughout her life Fatimah Rifaat became a member of the Federation of Egyptian Writers, the Short-Story Club, and the Dar al-Udaba (Egypt). She also attended the First International Women's Book Fair (London, England) in 1984 where she spoke about the rights of women in Islam and the topic of polygamy.
In 1984 Fatimah Rifaat received the Excellency Award from the Modern Literature Assembly.

Fatimah Rifaat Died at the age of 65 in January 1996.  She left behind three sons and a body of over 100 works that have been translated into multiple languages and have been produced for television.  Some of her works have also been read on BBC.

Literary themes and translations
Alifa Rifaat wrote in Arabic throughout her literary career.  Her style, though focusing more on romance in the beginning of her career, later shifted to social critique after she met translator Denys John-Davies.  Denys also persuaded her to write in a more colloquial style of Arabic, which although being a more accessible form of writing to the Egyptian population, was also during this period a less desired form of writing than the formal style. Her novels and short stories have been translated into multiple languages including English, German, Dutch, and Swedish.  The most popular English translation of her work is of her collection of short stories, Distant View of a Minaret and Other Short Stories, which is translated by Denys Johnson-Davies.

Fatimah Rifaat, unlike the prominent Egyptian Feminist Nawal El Saadawi, focused her writing on women in traditional Islamic roles.  In her autobiography Fatimah describes her father's lack of affection towards her as a possible root of her exploration of the needs and desires of men in terms of women.  She continues on to relate that through her life she found that "all men seek is pleasure.  For that reason I cry out for complete and complementary love in all my writings." Fatimah also expresses in her autobiography the need for men and women to only participate in intercourse when they are in a serene state, so that orgasm can be achieved, which she believes acts to strengthen faith in God.

Fatimah Rifaat's writing centers upon the silent plight of women in a patriarchal Muslim society.  Her stories mainly take place in provincial Egypt.  These stories handle themes such as sex, death, marriage, masturbation, clitoridectomy, love, teenage pregnancy, widowhood, and loss along with other controversial topics.  During this time period a woman was considered a purely sexual being, and the allowance of freedom of her sexuality was feared to result in fitna, or societal chaos. Although Alifa Rifaat strove to express through writing the sexual repression of women, her stories and her life were conducted in an orthodox Muslim manner and she did not advocate the rise of women against patriarchy.  Most of Rifaat's female protagonists take a resigned or begrudgingly accepting stance towards the hardships they face in life. For Fatimah Rifaat, patriarchy is merely a fact of life and acceptable under Quranic terms, however it is the opposite and in some instances even the same gender's lack of observance towards religious teachings that acts as the catalyst to many of the protagonists’ problems.  In her stories many of the sexual encounters take place during the characters' marriage and there is no instance of extra-marital male-female relationships as this would be considered purely sinful under the practice of Islam.

Some of Fatimah Rifaat's most popular stories include "Distant View of a Minaret,"  "Bahiyya’s Eyes," and "My World of the Unknown."

Distant View of a Minaret 
Distant View of a Minaret opens with a husband and wife performing the act of intercourse.  The story is told from the wife's point of view and it is quickly revealed that during this interaction she is both uninterested and feels estranged from her husband.  She recalls how in the past she attempted to express her desire for sexual satisfaction to her husband which was met in return with denial and anger.  At some point during the act she becomes aware of the call to prayer.  Afterwards she performs necessary ablutions and her prayers, a ritual with which she feels more in touch with than with her own relationship with her husband.  She then peers out the window to look at a minaret in Cairo, recounting how there used to be a view of multiple minarets before new buildings blocked them out.  The husband then suffers from a heart attack while still in bed and dies.  In the end the protagonist is dully surprised at how calm she has remained during and after her husband's death.
This story conveys the passive female sexual role as pushed by selfish male domination of the sexual relationship in marriage.  The lone minaret likely represents the solitude that the female protagonist experiences having resigned to this role.

Bahiyya’s Eyes 
Bahiyya’s Eyes is told from the perspective of the aged Bahiyya speaking to her daughter after visiting a doctor about her loss of sight.  She tells her daughter that although the doctor's diagnosis attributes her loss of sight to natural causes and tells her she can be treated with medication she knows that it is instead due to all of the tears she has cried because of her life as a woman.  Bahiyya then recounts her childhood, her clitoridectomy by the women of her village, her widowhood and the hardships of raising children as a single mother.
This story tackles the issue of suppression of female sexuality through recounting the events of Bahiyya's childhood.  She continues on to lament the position of women in society and the upholding of this low status by members of both genders. Bahiyya is also a name for Egypt.

My World of the Unknown 
My World of the Unknown centers on a woman who enters into a sexual awakening with the aid of a jinni in the form of a snake.  When the woman and her husband move into a house the wife discovers a female jinni in the form of a snake who teaches her the height of sexual pleasure.  The woman remains with the snake despite her confusion until her husband kills a snake in the yard, violating the code of the jinni, at which point the female jinni leaves.

This story deals with the issue of feminine pleasure.  Although the wife does have an affair with the jinni, since the creature is female it is not considered adultery.

List of collective works
 "Eve Returns to Adam" (1975) Arabic  -series of romances largely devoid of social critique.
 "Who Can Man Be?" (1981) Arabic  – proved to be very controversial and was not sold in most Egyptian stores.
 "The Prayer of Love" (1983) Arabic.
 Distant View of a Minaret and Other Stories (1983) English translation.
 "On a Long Winter’s Night" (1980) Arabic.
 The Pharaoh’s Jewel (1991) Arabic- historical novel.
 A House in the Land of the Dead (Unfinished) Arabic.

Tribute
On June 5, 2021, Google celebrated her 91st birthday with a Google Doodle.

References

Sources
  Liya, L. (1999). "My World of the Unknown": A Catharsis for the Sexual Awakening of an Egyptian Woman Writer. Community Review, 1771.
Nkealah, N. (2008). Reconciling Arabo-Islamic culture and feminist consciousness in North African women's writing: silence and voice in the short stories of Alifa Rifaat and Assia Djebar Tydskrif vir Letterkunde, 45(1), 19–41.
 Alifa Rifaat. (n.d.).
 Hatem, M. (1986). The Lives Behind the Politics [Review of the book Two Women in One Distant View of a Minaret and Other Stories A Bridge through Time A Wife for My Son Jana Gough Nawal el-Saadawi Osman Nusairi Alifa Rifaat Denys Johnson Davies Laila Said Ali Ghalem G. Kazolias]. The Women's Review of Books, 3(10), 10–11. 
 Rifaat, A. (1983). Distant View of a Minaret and Other Short Stories (J. Davies, Trans.). Quartet Books Limited.
 "Fatimah Rifat." Crosshatching in Global Culture; A Dictionary of Modern Arab Writers: An Updated English Version of R.B. Campbelll's "Contemporary Arab Writers." Ed. John J Donohue and Leslie Tramontini. Vol. II. Lebanon: Orient-Institut, 2004. Print. 2 vols.

1930 births
1996 deaths
Egyptian novelists
Egyptian women novelists
Egyptian women short story writers
Egyptian short story writers
Egyptian women writers
20th-century women writers
20th-century novelists
Egyptian feminists
Arabic-language women poets
Arabic-language poets
Proponents of Islamic feminism
20th-century poets
20th-century short story writers